

General

German magazines and (private) TV stations have affected the development of Austria since their foundation. Because German TV stations broadcast by satellite, it is possible to receive them throughout Austria as well.

Newspapers

Broadsheet
 Die Presse centre-right, classical liberal
 Der Standard centre-left, social liberal
 Salzburger Nachrichten centre-right, Christian liberal
 Wiener Zeitung organ of the Republic of Austria

Intermediate
 Kurier, centre, social liberal
 Neues Volksblatt
 Oberösterreichische Nachrichten
 Tiroler Tageszeitung
 Rundschau
 Vorarlberger Nachrichten

Tabloid
 Kronen Zeitung populist
 Kleine Zeitung moderate, Catholic-liberal
 Österreich populist
 Heute populist [German link]

Historical Archive
 ANNO - AustriaN Newspapers Online by the Österreichische Nationalbibliothek (Austrian National Library) including online search of historical newspapers (1689-1946).

Magazines

High brow
 profil current events, moderate
 Datum current events, liberal
 Gewinn finance and economics

Low brow
 NEWS society, current events

TV

 ORF eins, 2, III and Sport+, the Austrian nationwide television channels by public broadcaster ORF
 ATV, private TV channel in Austria
 Puls 4, private TV channel in Austria 
 Servus TV, private TV channel in Austria
 FS1, Community TV channel in Salzburg

Austria was the second last European country (Albania was the last one) when it officially allowed other TV stations in 2003.

Radio

 ORF OE1 News and documentaries
 ORF OE2 Regional Radioprogramm, featuring mostly folk- and folkish music
 ORF OE3 Pop / Rock music
 ORF FM4 Cutting edge music channel, youth oriented
 Kronehit Private radio, Pop / Rock music
 Antenne Private radio, 1970s, 1980s and 1990s music
 Radiofabrik, Community radio in Salzburg
 Orange 94.0, Community radio in Vienna Its self declared aim is to amplify those voices, which are ignored by the mainstream media.

Austria was the last European country where radio broadcasting was a state monopoly until 1998, when private radio stations were officially allowed.

Online

 Kontrast.at (DE), social democratic political online magazine, published by SPÖ 
 mokant.at (DE), independent Austrian online magazine
 ORF.at (DE), News service of the public broadcaster
 Unzensuriert.at(DE), right-wing news-magazine, published by FPÖ

See also
 Open access in Austria to scholarly communication

References

Bibliography

External links